Anthony George Paul (born 6 April 1961 in Islington ) is an English former professional footballer who played in the Football League as a midfielder.

References

External links
Crystal Palace profile at Holmesdale

1961 births
Living people
Footballers from Isleworth
English footballers
Association football midfielders
English Football League players
Crystal Palace F.C. players
Croydon F.C. players
Mikkelin Palloilijat players
Expatriate footballers in Finland
English expatriate footballers